Francisco Rueda Gómez (born 22 November 1964) is a Mexican politician affiliated with the National Action Party. As of 2014 he served as Deputy of the LX Legislature of the Mexican Congress representing Baja California.

References

1964 births
Living people
Politicians from Tijuana
National Action Party (Mexico) politicians
21st-century Mexican politicians
Members of the Congress of Baja California
Autonomous University of Baja California alumni
Deputies of the LX Legislature of Mexico
Members of the Chamber of Deputies (Mexico) for Baja California